Oriental Mart is a Filipino restaurant in Seattle's Pike Place Market, in the U.S. state of Washington. In 2020, the business received an 'America's Classics' award the James Beard Foundation.

Description
Oriental Mart operates in Pike Place Market's Corner Market building. The menu changes daily and has included pork adobo, longanisa sausage with rice and pancit noodles, and salmon sinigang.

References

External links
 

Asian restaurants in Seattle
Philippine cuisine
Pike Place Market
Central Waterfront, Seattle
James Beard Foundation Award winners